{{DISPLAYTITLE:C2H2N2O}}
The molecular formula C2H2N2O (molar mass: 70.05 g/mol, exact mass: 70.0167 u) may refer to:

 Oxadiazoles
 Furazan (1,2,5-oxadiazole)
 1,3,4-Oxadiazole